Entertainment is the second studio album by American pop rock band Waterparks, released on January 26, 2018. It was produced by Benji Madden of Good Charlotte and was their final release under Equal Vision Records. The album debuted at number 85 in the UK and number 98 on the Billboard 200, spawning three singles: "Blonde", "Lucky People" and "Not Warriors".

Promotion
On October 20, 2017, Waterparks revealed the album's title, artwork, and release date via social media, and released the first single from the record, "Blonde". Pre-orders for the album opened in tandem with the release of the "Blonde" official music video on November 2, 2017. The album's second and third singles, "Lucky People" and "Not Warriors", were released on December 14, 2017, and January 17, 2018, respectively.

Composition
Musically, Entertainment has been described as pop punk, pop rock, pop, bubblegum pop, rock, electropop, and synth-pop. The album also uses elements of post-hardcore and dark pop.

Critical reception

Phoebe Constable of Dead Press gave praise to Awsten Knight's vocals and the catchability throughout the track listing, concluding that "Ultimately, Entertainment is a consistently strong pop-rock release. [A] bit more variety in places would've been a nice touch, but nevertheless it doesn't stop it being an incredibly fun listen that's bound to be a great soundtrack to the summers ahead." Rob Sayce of Rock Sound praised the band for avoiding the sophomore slump by crafting a record that's "vibrant, surprising and borderline-scarily addictive" with a creative mix of various subgenres and Knight's "uniquely relatable" lyricism, concluding that, "By taking some huge risks and refusing to be to tied to any one lane, they've proved every doubter wrong." Logan White of Substream Magazine felt the album started off strong with its first two tracks and kept the momentum going with surprising forays into acoustic-driven love songs and electronic beats, concluding that "Entertainment is fun, catchy, and even a little bit unpredictable. Waterparks have pushed forward to become the best version of themselves that they can be, proving that they are here to stay." Dork writer Dan Harrison commented about the band's penchant for matching "awkward emotion" with a "day-glo" pop punk soundscape and sugary choruses over salty subject matter, saying "A juxtaposition that's proven effective time and time again, Entertainment may be more popcorn than a three course dinner, but it hits the spot every time."

Track listing

Notes
The track "Tantrum" is stylized in all caps.

Personnel
Credits for Entertainment

Waterparks
 Awsten Knight – lead vocals, guitar, bass, additional programming
 Geoff Wigington – guitar
 Otto Wood – drums

Production
 Benji Madden – producer
 Courtney Ballard – producer, mixing, engineering
 Colin Schwanke – engineering
 Matt Lang – engineering
 Patrick Kehrier – engineering
 Bryan Gardner – mastering
 Jared Poythress – programming
 Marty Tzonev – cover art
 Bill Scoville – cover art layout

Charts

References

2018 albums
Waterparks (band) albums
Equal Vision Records albums